The 2016 Dunlop MSA British Touring Car Championship (commonly abbreviated as BTCC) was a motor racing championship for production-based touring cars held across England and Scotland. The championship featured a mix of professional motor racing teams and privately funded amateur drivers competing in highly modified versions of family cars which are sold to the general public and conform to the technical regulations for the championship. The 2016 season was the 59th British Touring Car Championship season and the sixth season for cars conforming to the Next Generation Touring Car (NGTC) technical specification. Gordon Shedden successfully defended his title and equaled long-time team mate Matt Neal as a three time Champion.

Teams and drivers

Driver changes
 Changed teams
 Andrew Jordan moved from MG Triple Eight Racing to Motorbase Performance.
 Stewart Lines moved from Houseman Racing to Maximum Motorsport.
 Jack Goff moved from MG Triple Eight Racing to Team IHG Rewards Club.
 Rob Austin moved from Exocet AlcoSense Racing to Handy Motosport.
 James Cole moved from Motorbase Performance to Team BMR.
 Hunter Abbott moved from Exocet AlcoSense Racing to Power Maxed Racing.
 Jake Hill moved from AmD Tuning to RCIB Insurance Racing.
 Josh Cook moved from Power Maxed Racing to MG Triple Eight Racing.
 Árón Smith moved from Team BMR to Team BKR.

 Entering/re-entering BTCC
 Maximum Motorsport entered the series, having bought AmD Tuning's Ford Focus ST and the team's second TOCA BTCC Licence (TBL).
 Double European Hot Rod champion and twice Quaife Intermarque champion, Matt Simpson, made his debut in the BTCC with Speedworks Motorsport in a Team Dynamics-built Honda Civic Type R.
 2013 MINI Challenge champion Chris Smiley, made his debut in the BTCC with RCIB Insurance Racing.
 Andy Neate returned to the series with Halfords Yuasa Racing, having last raced in 2013.
 2015 Renault UK Clio Cup champion Ashley Sutton, made his debut in the BTCC with MG Triple Eight Racing.
 Ollie Jackson returned to the series with AmD Tuning, after a single season away, having last raced with the team in 2012.
 Former VW Racing Cup driver Michael Epps, made his debut in the BTCC with RCIB Insurance Racing.
 Renault UK Clio Cup Masters champion Mark Howard, made his debut with the also debuting Team BKR.
 Actor Kelvin Fletcher, made his debut in the BTCC with Power Maxed Racing.
 Former Porsche Carrera Cup Great Britain driver Daniel Lloyd, made his return in the BTCC with Eurotech Racing after a one-off appearance at Croft in 2010, following the withdrawal of Andy Neate at Halfords Yuasa Racing.

 Leaving BTCC
 Houseman Racing left the series, having sold their TBL, car and race equipment to Eurotech Racing.
 Mike Bushell left the series having been unable to secure a top drive, instead he opted to return to the Renault Clio Cup UK.
 Simon Belcher took a sabbatical year from the series, to focus on his team Handy Motorsport.
 Kieran Gallagher left the series, having intended to switch to the new-for-2016 B-TEC Development Series. However, in March 2016, the series was postponed until 2017.
 Dave Newsham left the series, having switched to the British Rallycross Championship.
 Support Our Paras Racing and Derek Palmer Jr. left the series after a single season in the championship.
 Alain Menu left the series, after replacing Warren Scott at Team BMR in the 2015 season finale.
 Nicolas Hamilton left the series, after joining Channel 4's Formula One presentation team.
 Andy Priaulx left the series, having joined Ford's FIA World Endurance Championship LMGTE-Pro program.

Team changes
 Eurotech Racing switched from a Honda Civic to a Honda Civic Type R. The team was set to expand to a three-car outfit, having bought Houseman Racing's TBL, car and race equipment. However, in March 2016, the team confirmed that they had postponed the expansion to 2017. However, after the withdrawal off Andy Neate at Halfords Yuasa Racing, the team received a third TBL on loan.
 Halfords Yuasa Racing and Speedworks Motorsport were both granted an additional TBL each on 4 November 2015 for the 2016 season.
 Team BMR switched from a Volkswagen CC to a Subaru Levorg Sports Tourer, having gained manufacturer support from Subaru.
 Handy Motorsport was set to expand to a two-car outfit, having gained an additional TBL from Exocet AlcoSense Racing. However, in February 2016, the team confirmed that the expansion had been put on hold for 2017 and instead the team will run a single car during the season.
 Team HARD expanded to a three-car outfit, having gained two additional TBL's following the withdrawal of Exocet AlcoSense Racing and Support Our Paras Racing from the championship.

Race calendar

The provisional calendar was announced by the championship organisers on 27 July 2015, with no major changes from previous seasons.

Results

Championship standings

Notes
No driver may collect more than one point for leading a lap per race regardless of how many laps they lead.

Drivers' Championship
(key)

Manufacturers'/Constructors' Championship

Teams' Championship

Independents' Trophy

Independent Teams' Trophy

Jack Sears Trophy

References

External links

TouringCarTimes

British Touring Car Championship seasons
Touring Car Championship